Karosa LC 737 is a prototype of a long-distance coach produced by bus manufacturer Karosa from the Czech Republic, made in the year 1991. It was succeeded by Karosa LC 937 in 1996.

Construction features 
Karosa LC 737 is model of Karosa 700 series. LC 737 is unified with intercity bus models such as C 734 and B 732, but has completely different design. Body is semi-self-supporting with frame and engine with manual gearbox is placed in the rear part. Only rear axle is propulsed. Front axle is independent, rear axle is solid. All axles are mounted on air suspension. On the right side are two doors. Inside are used high padded seats. Drivers cab is not separated from the rest of the vehicle.

Production and operation 
In the year 1991 was made one prototype.

Historical vehicles 
empty

See also 

 List of buses

Buses manufactured by Karosa
Buses of the Czech Republic